Gardner's relation, or Gardner's equation, named after G. H. F. Gardner and L. W. Gardner, is an empirically derived equation that relates seismic P-wave velocity to the bulk density of the lithology in which the wave travels. The equation reads:

Assuming this, the equation is reduced to:

If  is measured in m/s,  and the equation is:

This equation is very popular in petroleum exploration because it can provide information about the lithology from interval velocities obtained from seismic data.

References

Seismology